Michael Gill (born 13 June 1998) is a cyclist from England, who last rode for UCI Continental team  in road racing and HUUB WattShop on the track.

Early life and education 
Gill is a former world champion in gymnastics. As part of a quartet of gymnasts, he won the 2014 FIG Acrobatic Gymnastics World Age Group Championship held in Paris. Gill is also a silver medalist at the 2013 European Gymnastics Championships. Gill graduated from the University of Nottingham in 2019 with degrees in Economics and Business and Management.

Cycling career
At the 2023 British Cycling National Track Championships, Gill won two silver medals in the Individual Pursuit and the Team Pursuit. He had previously won a bronze medal in the team pursuit at the 2020 British National Track Championships when riding with the AeroLab Ward WheelZ team.

Major Results 
Source:

2018
1st Manilla Presca Autumn Series #3
1st Manilla Presca Autumn Series #4
2nd Tyneside Vagabonds Spring Crits
2nd Muckle CC Men's Road Race
2019
1st The Bike-Inn and Avion Spring Shield 1
1st The Bike-Inn and Avion Spring Shield 3
1st The Prima Hetton Circuit Series Round 1
2nd EMMR: UoN Harvey Hadden #1
2nd Blaydon Road Race
3rd Boompods Summer Evening Criterium #2
2nd Scottish National Senior Track Championships
3rd Peter Taylor Memorial Road Race
2021
2nd Worcester Classic Road Race
3rd Mark Evans Memorial Series 2
3rd Darley Moor Race #8
2022
3rd East Midlands Regional Road Race Championships

Track 
2020
National Championships
3rd Team pursuit
2023
National Championships
2nd Individual pursuit
2nd Team pursuit

References

External links 

Living people
1998 births
People from Ponteland
Sportspeople from Northumberland